The Pentax Q is a mirrorless interchangeable-lens camera introduced by Pentax on June 23, 2011.

Characteristics
Introduced as "The world's smallest interchangeable lens system camera…" The Pentax Q system is composed of four bodies (Q, Q10, Q-7, Q-S1) and eight lenses: the 01 prime normal, the 02 wide-tele zoom, 03 fish-eye, the 04 "toy" wide angle, the 05 "toy" telephoto, the 06 telephoto zoom, the 07 "mount shield" lens, and the 08 ultra-wide zoom. The zooms and prime normal lenses have leaf shutters (with built-in neutral density filters) and sync with flash up to 1/2000 of a second. The other lenses use the camera's electronic shutter. The 09 macro lens was prototyped but never released. Modern Pentax K mount lenses can be used on the Q with an adapter that has a mechanical shutter. Other adapted lenses use the electronic shutter.

The camera's small sensor size (1/2.3") means that the Q has a crop factor of 5.6× (compared to full-frame 35mm cameras), as well as a short flange focal distance (FFD). With the 5.6× crop factor, a 100mm macro lens (for example) results in a 35mm equivalent field of view (FOV) of a 560mm telephoto. An additional implication of the 5.6× crop factor and associated optics is that depth of field (DOF) is increased proportionally for a given aperture setting (in comparison to the 35mm equivalent DOF at the same aperture). This means that in some applications the small Pentax Q sensor offers an advantage over larger formats. This also allows the Pentax Q lenses to be proportionally smaller than lenses designed for larger formats.

The short FFD of the Pentax Q enables it to accept manual focus lenses from many manufacturers (via adapters) including Nikon F, Leica M and 39M, Olympus OM, Canon FD, Minolta, M42 screw mount, C-Mount, D-Mount, Pentax K, and Pentax Auto 110.

The Pentax Q has a wide range of digital effects and controls including high dynamic range (HDR), multiple scene modes, and a bokeh function which, when activated, can enable a pseudo shallow-focus effect.

The camera is equipped with sensor-shift image stabilization technology to improve image quality at slow shutter speeds or when using telephoto lenses. It has a "focus peaking" function as well. Sensor shift and focus peaking functions also work with adapted lenses.

The Q7 and Q-S1 models have a larger sensor size (1/1.7") resulting in a crop factor of 4.6×.

References

External links
Specs at DPReview

Contemporary YouTube review of the camera  

Q
Cameras introduced in 2011